William IV (Willem Karel Hendrik Friso; 1 September 1711 – 22 October 1751) was Prince of Orange from birth and the first hereditary stadtholder of all the United Provinces of the Netherlands from 1747 until his death in 1751. During his whole life he was furthermore ruler of the Principality of Orange-Nassau within the Holy Roman Empire.

Early life
William was born in Leeuwarden, Netherlands, the son of John William Friso, Prince of Orange, head of the Frisian branch of the House of Orange-Nassau, and of his wife Landgravine Marie Louise of Hesse-Kassel (or Hesse-Cassel).  He was born six weeks after the death of his father.

William succeeded his father as Stadtholder of Friesland and also, under the regency of his mother until 1731, as Stadtholder of Groningen.  In 1722 he was elected Stadtholder of Guelders. The four other provinces of the Dutch Republic:, Holland, Zeeland, Utrecht and Overijssel had in 1702 decided not to appoint a stadtholder after the death of stadtholder William III, issuing the history of the Republic into a period that is known as the Second Stadtholderless Period. In 1747 those four provinces also accepted William as their stadtholder.

Marriage and children
In 1720 William was named the 549th Knight of the Order of the Garter. On 25 March 1734 he married at St James's Palace Anne, Princess Royal, eldest daughter of King George II of Great Britain and Caroline of Ansbach.  William and Anne had five children:

 a stillborn daughter (born 19 December 1736)
 a stillborn daughter (born 22 December 1739)
 Princess Carolina of Orange-Nassau (28 February 1743 – 6 May 1787), married Karl Christian of Nassau-Weilburg
 Princess Anna of Orange-Nassau (15 November 1746 – 29 December 1746)
 William V, Prince of Orange (8 March 1748 – 9 April 1806)

Later life
In 1739 William inherited the estates formerly owned by the Nassau-Dillenburg branch of his family, and in 1743 he inherited those formerly owned by the Nassau-Siegen branch of his family.

In 1740, the War of the Austrian Succession broke out. The conflict pitted Austria against France over the issue of whether Maria Theresa had the right to inherit her father Emperor Charles VI's crown. The Dutch Republic sided with Austria in 1747 in order to maintain a buffer zone between itself and France, whereupon French troops invaded the Austrian Netherlands. In a few weeks, Louis XV's troops conquered most of the towns in the Austrian Netherlands where the Dutch had stationed troops under the Barrier Treaty, as well as the most important towns in Zeelandic Flanders.  The Dutch Republic was at the time weakened by internal division. The Dutch decided that their country needed a single strong executive, and turned to the House of Orange. William and his family moved from Leeuwarden to The Hague. On 4 May 1747, the States General of the Netherlands named William General Stadtholder of all seven of the United Provinces of the Netherlands, and made the position hereditary for the first time. William first met Duke Louis Ernest of Brunswick-Lüneburg in 1747, and two years later appointed him field marshal of the Dutch States Army, which later led to Louis Ernest serving as one of the regents for William's heir.

William IV was considered an attractive, educated, and accomplished prince in his prime. Although he had little experience in state affairs, William was at first popular with the people.  He stopped the practice of indirect taxation by which independent contractors managed to make large sums for themselves. Nevertheless, he was also a Director-General of the Dutch East India Company, and his alliance with the business class deepened while the disparity between rich and poor grew.

William served as General Stadtholder of all the Netherlands until he died of a stroke in 1751 at The Hague.

The county of Orange, Virginia, and the city of Orangeburg, South Carolina, are named after him.

Ancestry

Notes

External links
 

1711 births
1751 deaths
People of the Patriottentijd
Princes of Orange
Counts of Nassau
Dutch stadtholders
House of Orange-Nassau
Lords of Breda
Knights of the Garter
Burials in the Royal Crypt at Nieuwe Kerk, Delft
People from Leeuwarden
Modern child monarchs
18th-century Dutch military personnel
Dutch military personnel of the War of the Austrian Succession